Mycoglaena is a genus of fungi in the class Dothideomycetes. The relationship of this taxon to other taxa within the class is unknown (incertae sedis).

Species
Mycoglaena acuminans
Mycoglaena alni
Mycoglaena betularia
Mycoglaena collosporella
Mycoglaena elegans
Mycoglaena fallaciosa
Mycoglaena fllicina
Mycoglaena kuemmerlei
Mycoglaena lichenoides
Mycoglaena myricae
Mycoglaena quercicola
Mycoglaena subcoerulescens
Mycoglaena viridis
Mycoglaena yasudae

See also
 List of Dothideomycetes genera incertae sedis

References 

Dothideomycetes enigmatic taxa
Dothideomycetes genera
Taxa named by Franz Xaver Rudolf von Höhnel
Taxa described in 1909